The 2007 European Race Walking Cup was held in Victoria Park, Royal Leamington Spa, United Kingdom, on 20 May 2007.

Complete results were published. The junior events are documented on the World Junior Athletics History webpages. Medal winners were published on the Athletics Weekly website,

Medallists

Results

Men's 20 km

Team (20 km Men)

Men's 50 km

Team (50 km Men)

Men's 10 km (Junior)

Team (10 km Junior Men)

Women's 20 km

Team (20 km Women)

Women's 10 km Junior

Team (10 km Junior Women)

Participation
The participation of 249 athletes ( men/ women) from 29 countries is reported.

 (1)
 (13)
 (1)
 (4)
 (2)
 (7)
 (4)
 (18)
 (7)
 (8)
 (16)
 (7)
 (18)
 (7)
 (10)
 (2)
 (2)
 (17)
 (14)
 (7)
 (18)
 (2)
 (8)
 (18)
 (4)
 (4)
 (5)
 (20)
 (5)

References

European Race Walking Cup
European Race Walking Cup
European Race Walking Cup
International athletics competitions hosted by England